Wally West is a DC Comics fictional character and the third Flash.

Wally West may also refer to:
Wallace West (character),  a cousin to the Silver Age DC Comics character and the third Kid Flash
Wallace West (1900–1980), American science fiction writer

See also
Walter West (disambiguation)